Ruth Allen may refer to:

Ruth Allen (singer), London cabaret artist and singer
Ruth Allen (economist) (1889–1979)
Ruth F. Allen (1879–1963), plant pathologist

See also
Allen (surname)